Confessions of a Teenage Jesus Jerk is a 2017 film directed by Eric Stoltz, produced by Kenny Hughes and written by Tony DuShane, with the screenplay based on his own novel.

Set in the mid-1980s in California, it is about a young Jehovah's Witness and his doubts and sexual experiences, or lack thereof, over the course of about a year. Scenes within the Jehovah's Witnesses community and families are contrasted to "worldly" settings, often symbolized by presence of globes. Short interviews, appearing to be interviews with real Jehovah's Witnesses, are interspersed in. One interviewee was played by David Hedison (1927-2019), in his final film role.

Cast
Sasha Feldman played Gabe, the main character.  
Paul Edelstein, Gabe's father.
Charlie Buhler played Jasmine.
Kelsey Lewis, as Ally.
Lauren Lakis as Karen, Gabe's cousin.
Kit DeZolt as Kien.
Rob Giles as Uncle Jeff.
Nicholas Harsin, as Peter, who dies.
Tara Summers, as Linn, Gabe's aunt. 
David Hedison, as Interviewee #2
James Karen
Bevin Hamilton
Shari Belafonte, as Flo, a librarian.
Catherine Waller, as Krissy.
 Tegan West as Brother Knox.

References

External links
 
Confessions of a Teenage Jesus Jerk

2017 films
2010s English-language films
Films directed by Eric Stoltz